Mohamed Salem may refer to:

 Mohamed Salem (footballer, born 1940) (1940–2008), Algerian footballer
 Mohamed Salem (footballer, born 1994), Egyptian footballer
 Mohamed Salem (wrestler) (born 1944), Egyptian Olympic wrestler
 Mohamed Ben Salem (born 1953), Tunisian politician
 Mohamed Abd-el-Kader Salem, Egyptian academic and politician
 Mohamed Salem Al-Tunaiji (born 1969), Emirati middle-distance runner